Spotted dog may refer to:
The common name for Pulmonaria, a flowering plant
An alternate name for Spotted dick, a type of English pudding
Spotted Dog, Forest Gate, a London pub